This is a list of Greek football transfers for the 2018–19 winter transfer window by club. Only transfers of clubs in the Superleague and Football League are included.

The winter transfer window opened on 1 January 2019, although a few transfers took place prior to that date. The window closed at midnight on 1 February 2019. Players without a club may join one at any time, either during or in between transfer windows.

Superleague

AEK Athens

In:

Out:

AEL

In:

Out:

Apollon Smyrnis

In:

Out:

Aris

In:

Out:

Asteras Tripolis

In:

Out:

Atromitos

In:

Out:

Lamia

In:

Out:

Levadiakos

In:

Out:

OFI

In:

Out:

Olympiacos

In:

Out:

Panathinaikos

In:

Out:

Panetolikos

In:

Out:

Panionios

In:

Out:

PAOK

In:

Out:

PAS Giannina

In:

Out:

Xanthi

In:

Out:

Football League

AE Karaiskakis

In:

Out:

Aiginiakos

In:

Out:

Aittitos Spata

In:

Out:

AO Chania Kissamikos

In:

Out:

Apollon Larissa

In:

Out:

Apollon Pontou

In:

Out:

Doxa Drama

In:

Out:

Ergotelis

In:

Out:

Iraklis

In:

Out:

Irodotos

In:

Out:

Kerkyra

In:

Out:

Panachaiki

In:

Out:

Platanias

In:

Out:

Sparti

In:

Out:

Trikala

In:

Out:

Volos

In:

Out:

References

Greek
tran
2018–19